The Jamaica National Heritage Trust is responsible for the promotion, preservation, and development of Jamaica's material cultural heritage (buildings, monuments, bridges, etc.).

The organisation maintains the list of National Heritage Sites in Jamaica.

It is chartered by The Jamaica National Heritage Trust Act, 1985.

History
In 1958, the Jamaica National Heritage Trust was founded as the Jamaica National Trust Commission, the name being changed to the present form in 1985.

References

External links
JNHT website
Aerial view

Statutory bodies of Jamaica
Jamaica
1958 establishments in Jamaica
Organizations established in 1958
Historic sites in Jamaica
National heritage organizations